Jackson Terrace Historic District is a historic district in Lawrence, Massachusetts.  Jackson Terrace, located on the east side of Camapgnone Common, was developed as a residential extension of the Common,  with a small central park area ringed by residences.  The houses that line it are distinctive renditions of Italianate, Second Empire, and Queen Anne architecture.

The district was listed on the National Register of Historic Places in 1984.

See also
National Register of Historic Places listings in Lawrence, Massachusetts

References

Historic districts on the National Register of Historic Places in Massachusetts
National Register of Historic Places in Lawrence, Massachusetts